Toxotes may refer to:

Biology
 the genus of the Archerfish, including the following species:
Banded archerfish (Toxotes jaculatrix), Pallas 1767
Toxotes chatareus, Hamilton 1822
Smallscale archerfish (Toxotes microlepis), Günther 1860
Big scale archerfish (Toxotes oligolepis), Bleeker 1876
Toxotes blythii, Boulenger 1892
Toxotes lorentzi, Weber 1910
Toxotes kimberleyensis, Allen 2004

Other uses
the singular of Toxotai
Toxotes, Xanthi, a village in Greece